Haryana State Industrial and Infrastructure Development Corporation (HSIIDC) (established 8 March 1967), formerly Haryana State Industrial Development Corporation (HSIDC), headquartered at Panchkula, is a 100% state-owned agency of the government of Haryana in the Indian state of Haryana. For ease of doing business, Haryana is the first state in India to introduce a labour policy in 2005 and Land Pooling Policy in 2017, for which HSIIDC acts as the nodal agency. Haryana Financial Corporation provides financial assistance for setting up new industrial units and for the expansion and diversification of the existing industries. Various universities, educational and training institutes, including the nation's first skills university Haryana Vishwakarma Skill University, provide the human resources to capitalise on the infrastructure created by the HSIIDC.

HSVP is a related government owned agency responsible for the urban development.

History
Haryana State Industrial Development Corporation (HSIDC), was formed on 8 March 1967 by the Department of Industries & Commerce, Haryana to promote medium and large industries for rapid industrialisation. HSIDC was renamed to the Haryana State Industrial and Infrastructure Development Corporation (HSIIDC) in 2005.

HSIIDC organisation

Objectives

HSIIDC was formed to develop integrated industrial, commercial, special economic zones (SEZ)s, technology parks,
 Integrated Multimodal Logistics Hubs, road, rail, sports and public infrastructure in the state of Haryana in joint venture or public–private partnership. HSIIDC develops the basic infrastructure facilities such as internal roads, water supply, external electrification and affluent disposal system and then allots the industrial plots. Area in Haryana with they have well-developed infrastructure have easier access to markets for raw materials and finished products, credit, skilled labour, etc., hence HSIIDC has formed several subsidiaries to develop infrastructure in various sectors across the state.

Divisions
The authority has divided the districts of Haryana into four divisions or zones except Gurugram.

 Infrastructure planning
 Industrial Area development
 Real estate, Mining, Sports infrastructure development
 Business Development and Public Relations
 Grievances resolution
 General Administration (including HR, Finance and Legal)
 Information technology and Library
 Audit

Industrial clusters and theme parks

Haryana has developed at least 11 specialized Industrial Clusters and Theme Parks in the state of Haryana.

 Textile Hub, Panipat
 IIDC Narwana in Jind
 Food Park, Saha in Ambala
 Growth Centre, Saha in Ambala
 International Horticulture Market at Ganaur in Sonipat, 3 km northeast of Sonipat and 64 northeast of Delhi will be established under Haryana International Horticulture Marketing Corporation Limited (HIHMC).
 Footwear Park, Bahadurgarh
 Apparel Park, Barhi in Sonipat
 Theme Park, Kundli in Sonipat
 Electronic Hardware Technology Park, Kundli in Sonipat
 EPIP (Export Promotion Industrial Plots), Kundli in Sonipat
 Food Park, Rai in Sonipat
 Mega Food Park, at Rai, Sonipat 
 Gurugram Flower Mandi, with assistance of Netherland, was work-in-progress as of 2020.

Mega food parks 

Haryana, as a food surplus state, is vital for India's and global food security which also brings economic benefits to the state.
 
Mega Food Parks are approved by the Union Ministry of Food Processing Industries (MOFPI) which provides grants up to Rs 50 crores for each food park to a consortium of companies.

 Approved Mega Food Parks of Haryana are:
 Hafed Mega Food Park at IMT Rohtak on NH-9 is under implementation.
 HSIIDC Mega Food Park at Rai, Sonipat is under implementation
 Proposed, but not yet approved by the MOFPI, are as follows
 Sirsa, as northwest Haryana hub, especially for citrus products
 Hisar Airport commercial zone, as western Haryana hub, especially a hub for air cargo and international exports
 HMT Pinjore commercial zone, as northeast Haryana hub, especially a hub for apples from JK, Himachal and Uttrakhand
 Nangal Choudhary in Mahendragarh, as South Haryana hub for supplies to Rajasthan
 Uttawar on Delhi–Mumbai Expressway, as hub for supplies to NCR and Agra-Mathura

Multi-Modal Logistics Parks of India 

Multi-Modal Logistics Parks in India (MMLPI) is a government of India initiative to lower the logistics cost and time, enhance value add and boost economy. As of July 2021, MoRTH has planned to develop 35 MMLPs under Public-Private Partnership (PPP) in Design, Build, Finance, Operate and Transfer (DBFOT) mode. Based on the detailed project report (DPR), feasibility study and approved bidding document, the tender will be invited from companies. The bidding documents (The Model Concession Agreement and Request for Proposal) is being finalised for these 35 MMLPs, each of which will have a minimum area of 100 acres (40.5 hectares), with various modes of transport access, and comprising mechanized warehouses, specialized storage solutions such as cold storage, facilities for mechanized material handling and inter-modal transfer container terminals, and bulk and break-bulk cargo terminals. Logistics parks will further provide value-added services such as customs clearance with bonded storage yards, quarantine zones, testing facilities, and warehousing management services. Provisions will also be made for late-stage manufacturing activities such as kitting and final assembly, grading, sorting, labelling and packaging activities, re-working, and returns management.

Each MMLP Among these MMLP, Haryana has 1 following MMLP:

 Hisar Multi-Modal Logistics Parks, based at Hisar Airport.

Additional following MMLP are at planning stages:
 Sirsa
 Jind-Narwana 
 HMT Pinjore
 Ganaur in Sonipat
 Loharu
 Nangal Chaudhary in Mahendragarh
 Nuh or Uttawar in South Haryana near DFC

Industrial estates and townships
 

An industrial are developed on at least 1500 acres of contiguous land is defrined as the "Industrial Estate" (IE), smaller industrial areas are called "Industrial Model Township" (IMT – denoted by an asterisk or star symbol) and an IT Park (denoted by double asterisk or star symbol). Haryana has at least 24 IEs, 8 IMT and 1 IT Park including the following:

 Ambala
 Ambala Industrial estate 
 Saha Ambala Growth Centre Industrial estate
 Faridabad
 Faridabad Industrial estate
 Gurugram
 Udhyog Vihar Gurugram Industrial estate
 Sohna IMT*
 Roz-ka-Meo Industrial estate at Raisika
 Jind
 Jind Industrial estate 
 Narwana IMT*
 Karnal
 Karnal Industrial estate
 Mahendragarh
 Narnaul Industrial estate
 Panchkula
 Barwala Industrial estate
 Kalka Industrial estate
 Panchkula IMT*
 Panchkula IT Park**
 Panipat
 Panipat Industrial estate
 Rewari
 Bawal IMT*
 Dharuhera Industrial estate
 Manesar IMT*
 Jhajjar
 Bahadurgarh Industrial estate
 Kutana Industrial estate 
Rohtak
 Rohtak IMT*
 Sirsa
 Sirsa Industrial estate 
 Tohana Industrial estate
 Sonepat
 Kharkhoda IMT*
 Barhi Industrial estate
 Kundli Industrial estate 
 Murthal Industrial estate
 Rai Industrial estate
 Samalkha Industrial estate
 Sonepat Industrial estate
 Yamunanagar
 Manakpur IMT* 
 Yamunanagar Industrial estate 

 Marketing and business development office
 New Delhi

Integrated Multimodel Logistics Hubs (IMLH) 
 Existing, being expanded or under-construction
 Nangal Choudhary IMLH, existing near Delhi–Jaipur Expressway and Ambala–Narnaul Industrial Corridor with containerized road and rail facilities, to serve South Haryana, and North and East Rajasthan
 Rewari-Bawal as spoke
 Pinjore IMLH for the fruits, being developed at former HMT site on Ambala Chandigarh Expressway with containerized road and rail facilities as well as air cargo from Chandigarh Airport and Pinjore Airport to be developed into cargo and domestic passenger airport, to serve Chandigah, North Haryana, Himachal Pradesh and Eastern Punjab 
 Bilaspur to be developed as spoke with railway sliding on the proposed Chandigarh-Yamunanagar rail line
 Sonipat existing inland container depot and logistics park at Delhi-Chandigarh NH1, existing with road facilities, proposed to be expanded to IIMHL with air cargo from IGI Delhi
 Kharkhoda Footwear IMLH, in Sonipat under implementation with containerized road and rail cargo. Maruti Suzuki new manufacturing facility in Kharkhoda
 Manesar road cargo and railway sliding for Maruti Suzuki on Western Peripheral Expressway
 Along Western Peripheral Expressway
 Farrukhnagar, proposed with road and rail facilities as well as air cargo from IGI Delhi will serve Delhi, East Haryana
 Tapkan, proposed with road and with railway sliding on the proposed rail sliding facilities as well as air cargo from IGI Delhi and proposed Bhiwadi Cargo Airport, to create Bhiwadi-Taoru-Nuh agglomeration along DMIC and Delhi Mumbai Expressway, will serve South NCR, South Haryana and Northeast Rajasthan
 Hassanpur, proposed with road and rail cargo as well as air cargo from Jewar Airport, to create Palwal-Jewar agglomeration, will serve Southeast NCR, Southeast Haryana, East Rajasthan and South-Central UP
 Ferozepur Jhirka, on Delhi Mumbai Expressway with containerized road cargo and proposed Delhi-Sohna-Nuh-Alwar rail line, initially as spoke and eventually as Hub
 West Haryana
 Hisar IMLH, under implementation with road, rail and Hisar Aviation hub for the West Haryana and Eastern Rajasthan
 Loharu as spoke
 Fatehabad as spoke
 Meham, initially as a spoke until it is developed as a separate hub
 Sirsa IMLH, proposed hub for North Rajasthan, Western Punjab and Northwest Haryana, Hisar Airport to be expanded in to Civilian and Cargo enclave specially for the citrus fruits 
 Dabwali as spoke
 Central Haryana
 Meham IMLH, proposed with road, rail and air cargo for Haryana, Punjab and Rajasthan, air cargo from Hisar Airport as well from the proposed Meham Cargo Airport
 Charki Dadri as spoke with sliding on proposed Jhajjar-Charkhi Dadri-Jhumpa rail line,
 North Haryana
 Narwana towards Kaithal on Delhi-Amritsar-Katra Expressway for the south-central Punjab, with existing road and rail links and the proposed Narwana Airport
 Safidon as spoke
 East Haryana
 Karnal, on NH1 with containerized road and rail cargo for textile, hosiery, and scientific equipment.
 Pehowa as spoke

Policies
HSIIDC is the nodal agency for both labour policy and land pooling policy of the state.

Labour Policy

Haryana Labour Policy (HLP) was introduced in 2005 to enhance the ease of doing business in the state.

Land Pooling Policy
Haryana Land Pooling Policy (HLPP), approved in January 2018, is used by the HSVP for acquiring land from the landlords for developing residential sectors. Landlords join the scheme voluntarily and at least 70% landowners must agree to pool their contiguous land, who receive INR50,000 per acre per year until the land is developed. After the land is developed, the landlords also will receive 33% of the developed residential plots in proportion to the land contributed by them to the pool, 33% will be sold by HSVP, 33% will be used for developing services such as roads and parks.

Entrepreneur Center 
Haryana Entrepreneur Center is a single-window service centre for providing 70 types of services of 17 departments under one roof.

See also
 Haryana Shahari Vikas Pradhikaran
 Divisions of Haryana

References

External links
 HSIIDC Helpline

Economy of Gurgaon
State urban development authorities of India
Economy of Haryana
Companies based in Haryana
State agencies of Haryana
1967 establishments in Haryana